Caspi may refer to:

People 
 Avshalom Caspi (born 1960), an Israeli-American psychologist
 Joseph Caspi (1279—1340), a Provençal exegete, grammarian and philosopher
 Matti Caspi (born 1949), an Israeli composer, musician, singer and lyricist
 Nathanael ben Nehemiah Caspi (14th century-15th century), a Provençal scholar
 Ram Caspi (born 1939), an Israeli attorney 
 Omri Casspi (born 1988), an Israeli basketball player

Ancient people 
 Caspians, an ancient Iranian people dwelling along the southern and southwestern shores of the Caspian Sea.

Plants 
 Botón caspi (Anthodiscus pilosus), a plant species found in Amazonian Colombia and Peru
 Cachimbo caspi (Couratari guianensis), a woody plant species found in South America
 Huaira caspi (Cedrelinga cateniformis), a plant species found in Peru
 Leche caspi (Couma macrocarpa), a tropical plant species native to tropical, humid Central and South America
 Caspi or zapallo caspi (Pisonia ambigua), a tree species native to Paraguay, Argentina and Brazil

See also 
 Kaspi (surname), a Jewish surname
Kaspi, a town in central Georgia